The largescale yellowfish or Lowveld largescale yellowfish (Labeobarbus marequensis) is a species of fish in the family Cyprinidae. An African freshwater fish found from the Zambezi south to the Pongola River.

References

Labeobarbus
Fish described in 1841